Baudinard-sur-Verdon ("Baudinard-on-Verdon"), often simply referred to as Baudinard, is a commune in the Var department in the Provence-Alpes-Côte d'Azur region in Southeastern France. As of 2019, it had a population of 235. Baudinard-sur-Verdon is located on the departmental border with Alpes-de-Haute-Provence to the northwest, on the left bank of the river Verdon that marks part of it.

It is on the Lake of Sainte-Croix, south of the Sainte-Croix Dam. The commune is known for its Gorges de Baudinard on the Verdon, as well as the Prieuré de Valmogne outside the village.

See also
Communes of the Var department

References

Communes of Var (department)